The Duke of York Inn is a Grade II listed public house at Main Street, Elton, Derbyshire DE4 2BW.

It is on the Campaign for Real Ale's National Inventory of Historic Pub Interiors.

It was built in the 19th century.

References

Grade II listed pubs in Derbyshire
National Inventory Pubs